Erik Tul (born 1 August 1975) is a Slovenian rower. He competed in the men's double sculls event at the 1996 Summer Olympics.

References

External links
 

1975 births
Living people
Slovenian male rowers
Olympic rowers of Slovenia
Rowers at the 1996 Summer Olympics
People from Izola